Muarem Zekir (born 26 August 1973) is a retired Macedonian football goalkeeper of Turkish ethnicity, who last played for Renova.

Club career
Born in Skopje, Zekir played for local giants Vardar and won 5 league titles and 3 domestic cups with the club.

International career
He made his senior debut for Macedonia in a June 2001 World Cup qualification match against Moldova and has earned a total of 4 caps, scoring no goals. His final international was a January 2002 friendly match against Finland.

Honours
Macedonian First Football League: 5
 1993, 1994, 1995, 2002, 2003

Macedonian Football Cup: 3
 1993, 1995, 1999

References

External links

1973 births
Living people
Footballers from Skopje
Macedonian people of Turkish descent
Association football goalkeepers
Macedonian footballers
North Macedonia international footballers
FK Vardar players
FK Renova players
Macedonian First Football League players
Macedonian Second Football League players